The following is a list of the players who have achieved the most assists during their WNBA careers.

Statistics are accurate as of the end of the 2022 regular season.

Progressive list of assist leaders
This is a progressive list of assist leaders showing how the record increased through the years.
Statistics accurate as of September 8, 2022.

Notes

References

External links
WNBA Career Leaders and Records for Assists | Basketball-Reference.com - updated daily

Lists of Women's National Basketball Association players
Women's National Basketball Association statistics